Al-Wusta Club is  a football club based in Oman.

The club serves for the four Wilayats of the Al Wusta Governorate region; Haima, Duqm, Mahout and Al Jazer.

The club plays in the Oman First Division League.

References

External links 
Official Facebook page
Profile at SoccerWay

Al Wusta Governorate (Oman)
Association football clubs established in 2013